Roger Mostyn (born 31 August 1953) is a Welsh former professional footballer who played as a forward. He made appearances in the English Football League for his hometown club Wrexham, and also played for Bath City.

References

1953 births
Living people
Welsh footballers
Association football forwards
Wrexham A.F.C. players
Bath City F.C. players
English Football League players